Buschingomyia is a genus of midges in the family Cecidomyiidae. Buschingomyia harteni is the only described species in this genus and has only been recorded the United Arab Emirates.

References

Cecidomyiidae genera
Insects described in 2011
Taxa named by Mathias Jaschhof
Taxa named by Catrin Jaschhof
Monotypic Diptera genera